Kalon is a village in Tajikistan. It is located in Varzob District, one of the Districts of Republican Subordination. It is the seat of the jamoat Zideh. 
It is located along the old M34 highway.

References

Populated places in Districts of Republican Subordination